Tarik Kada (born 26 May 1996) is a Dutch-Moroccan professional footballer who plays as a winger. He formerly played for SC Heerenveen and FC Eindhoven.

References

External links
 
 

1996 births
Living people
Dutch footballers
Dutch expatriate footballers
Netherlands youth international footballers
Dutch sportspeople of Moroccan descent
SC Heerenveen players
Heracles Almelo players
FC Eindhoven players
Rovaniemen Palloseura players
Al-Ahli Club (Manama) players
Hidd SCC players
Bisha FC players
Eredivisie players
Eerste Divisie players
Veikkausliiga players
Bahraini Premier League players
Saudi Second Division players
People from Nador Province
Association football wingers
Dutch expatriate sportspeople in Finland
Dutch expatriate sportspeople in Bahrain
Dutch expatriate sportspeople in Saudi Arabia
Expatriate footballers in Finland
Expatriate footballers in Bahrain
Expatriate footballers in Saudi Arabia